William Harry Price (28 May 1900 – 15 April 1982) was an English first-class cricketer who played a single first-class match, for Worcestershire against Glamorgan at Cardiff Arms Park in 1923. His influence on the game was almost non-existent: he made 0 not out in his only innings, bowled three wicketless overs for 12 runs and did not hold a catch.

Price was born in the Shrub Hill area of Worcester, and died aged 81 in the same city.

He was the nephew of Ted Arnold, who also played for Worcestershire and appeared in ten Tests for England, and the brother of John Price, who played a handful of games for Worcestershire later in the 1920s.

External links
 

1900 births
1982 deaths
English cricketers
Worcestershire cricketers